The Wau River, or Wau Nahr (sometimes spelled Waw or Wow), is a river in South Sudan. It shares its name with Wau, the state capital of Western Bahr el Ghazal, where the river is located east of the international border with the Central African Republic.

See also
 List of rivers of South Sudan

External links
Wau River

Rivers of South Sudan
Bahr el Ghazal
Western Bahr el Ghazal